David et Jonathan was a 1980s vocal duet composed of David Marouani (born 1969) and Jonathan Bermudes (born 1968). The Pair is best known for their hits, "Bella Vita", "Gina" and "Est-ce que tu viens pour les vacances ?", which achieved huge success in France in 1987 and 1988 and earned Silver and Gold certifications. Several of their songs were written by Didier Barbelivien. When the band split up in 1990, both singers began solo careers, neither successfully.

Discography

Albums
 1990s : Fais pas semblant (David Marouani)

Singles
 1986 : "Bella Vita" - #2 in France, Gold disc
 1987 : "Gina" - #18 in France, Silver disc
 1988 : "Est-ce que tu viens pour les vacances ?" - #3 in France, Gold disc
 1988 : "Cœur de gosse" - #26 in France
 1989 : "Pour toi Arménie" (charity single)
 1990s : "Envie de pleurer" (David Marouani)
 1990s : "Mes Nuits au soleil" (Jonathan Bermudes)

References

French musical duos
Musical groups established in 1986
Musical groups disestablished in 1990
1986 establishments in France